The Nathaniel Moore Banta House is an Arts and Crafts residence adjacent to the Muller House on the grounds of the Arlington Heights Historical Museum, United States.  It has been on the National Register of Historic Places since May 20, 1998.

Notes

External links

 Arlington Heights Historical Museum

Arlington Heights, Illinois
Houses completed in 1908
Houses on the National Register of Historic Places in Cook County, Illinois
1908 establishments in Illinois